Woo Ming Jin is a Malaysian film director, writer and producer. His films have screened in film festivals such as Cannes, Berlin and Venice. He is also the co-founder of Greenlight Pictures, a film and television production house based in Kuala Lumpur.

Biography

Early career 
Woo Ming Jin was born and raised in Malaysia. At 19 years old, he went to the United States to study business in Boston but he had always wanted to be a filmmaker. He was then accepted to San Diego State University and earned a Master's degree in Film and Television Production.

Monday Morning Glory 
His first film Monday Morning Glory (2005) screened at the Berlin and Locarno Film Festivals, while his second, Elephant and the Sea (2007), won awards in Torino, Cinema Digital Seoul, Portugal and Spain film festivals. Woman on Fire Looks for Water (2009) premiered at the Venice International Film Festival, and has played in Busan, Rotterdam, Los Angeles and the Pompidou Center in Paris, among many others. The film is about a group of men arrested for the terrorist bombing of a nightclub have to reenact their actions for the police and media.

The Tiger Factory 
The Tiger Factory (2010), only the third film in Malaysian history to be selected to the Cannes Film Festival, premiered at the Directors' Fortnight, and won the Special Jury Mention at the Tokyo Film Festival in 2010. The film is about a girl named Ping Ping who wants to go to Japan to start a better life. She shuffles between two jobs; working in a pig farm, and cleaning dishes in a rundown restaurant. The film is described as a "rather uplifting tale about a young girl who is forced to rely on herself because she has no real support system".

KL Zombi 
In 2011, he conceived the idea for a zombie horror thriller titled Zombijaya. The book, which was written by Adib Zaini for Buku FIXI, tells the tale of a slacker who becomes a reluctant hero when a zombie outbreak robs him of the only life he knows. It would later evolve into a film in 2013 titled KL Zombi, in which Woo became the film director. The film adaptation became a box office success and one of the highest VOD films of the year. The film was also screened at the 18th Bucheon International Fantastic Film Festival from the 17th until the 24th of July 2014.

The Second Life of Thieves 
His most recent film, The Second Life of Thieves (2014), premiered at the Busan International Film Festival and has been supported by the Hubert Bals Fund of Rotterdam, and the Vision Sud Est Fund. The film is about Mr. Tan, the village chief, discovers his wife has disappeared with his good friend Mr. Lai. Forming an unlikely friendship with Mr. Lai's daughter Sandy, both of them embark on an emotional journey that will open old and new wounds alike. Juxtaposing between present day and 30 years in the past, the film is a meditation on love, lost, and regret. The story is inspired by Woo's late uncle and the secret life that he reportedly led.

Return to Nostalgia 
In 2015, he was commissioned by the Busan International Film Festival and KBS Studios to make a documentary on Malaysia's cinematic history. The resulting film, Return To Nostalgia, premiered at the festival, and was the opening film for the “Power of Asian Cinema” Series.

Woo and his crew travelled across the peninsula of Malaysia and Singapore in search of the lost film Seruan Merdeka (1947). Seruan Merdeka is the first post-World War II film made in Malaya. It is also the first film in the history of Malaysian cinema to feature a biracial cast of Malays and Chinese. While gradually uncovering information about the lost film, a doorway into one of Malaya's most turbulent times – the Japanese Occupation – is revealed.

Greenlight Pictures 
Greenlight Pictures is founded by Woo alongside Edmund Yeo who has produced all of Woo's films, including Woman on Fire Looks for Water, and The Tiger Factory, which premiered at the Venice and Cannes film festivals. In 2012, its co-production with CPH-Dox, Girl in the Water, won Denmark's Academy Award for best short film. Locally, Greenlight Pictures produces various content for television and the internet, from commercials to TV programs and drama series. Autumn Di Hatiku 1 & 2, made for Tonton Digital, received nominations for best digital show in the Asia TV Awards in 2014.

Greenlight Pictures also worked on KL Zombi, which was a box office hit in 2013. Other film credits include Mamak Cupcake, and two upcoming features in 2015/2016. Double, a horror short, was executive produced by Justin Lin, premiered on YouTube in 2012.

In 2014, Greenlight Pictures produced two feature films, The Second Life of Thieves and River of Exploding Durians, which was accepted for Competition at the Tokyo International Film Festival – the first ever Malaysian film to do so.

Filmography

Selected filmography

References

External links 

Greenlight Pictures at YouTube

Malaysian film directors
Malaysian film producers
Malaysian people of Chinese descent
Living people
Year of birth missing (living people)